In enzymology, a 13-hydroxydocosanoate 13-beta-glucosyltransferase is an enzyme that catalyzes the chemical reaction. This reaction is part of  biosynthesis. Extracts for research are frequently obtained from Candida yeasts.

UDP-glucose + 13-hydroxydocosanoate  UDP + 13-beta-D-glucosyloxydocosanoate

Thus, the two substrates of this enzyme are UDP-glucose and 13-hydroxydocosanoate, whereas its two products are UDP and 13-beta-D-glucosyloxydocosanoate.

This enzyme belongs to the family of glycosyltransferases, specifically the hexosyltransferases.  The systematic name of this enzyme class is UDP-glucose:13-hydroxydocosanoate 13-beta-D-glucosyltransferase. Other names in common use include 13-glucosyloxydocosanoate 2'-beta-glucosyltransferase, UDP-glucose:13-hydroxydocosanoic acid glucosyltransferase, uridine diphosphoglucose-hydroxydocosanoate glucosyltransferase, and UDP-glucose-13-hydroxydocosanoate glucosyltransferase.

References

 

EC 2.4.1
Enzymes of unknown structure